Hibbertia hermanniifolia is a species of flowering plant in the family Dilleniaceae and is endemic to eastern Australia. It is an erect shrub with spatula-shaped to wedge-shaped leaves and yellow flowers arranged singly in leaf axils, with ten to fifteen stamens arranged around two hairy carpels.

Description
There are ten to fifteen stamens arranged around the two hairy carpels, each carpel with two or four ovules. Flowering occurs from November to March.

Taxonomy
Hibbertia hermanniifolia was formally described in 1817 by Swiss botanist Augustin Pyramus de Candolle in his Regni Vegetabilis Systema Naturale from specimens collected by George Caley. 

In 2012, Hellmut R. Toelken described two subspecies in Journal of the Adelaide Botanic Gardens and the names are accepted by the Australian Plant Census:

Distribution and habitat
This hibbertia grows in forest on sandstone near Bents Basin, in the Yarrowitch area and south from the Wadbilliga National Park in New South Wales and on the rocky summits of mountains in north-eastern Victoria. Subspecies recondita only occurs in north-eastern Victoria.

See also
List of Hibbertia species

References

hermanniifolia
Flora of New South Wales
Flora of Victoria (Australia)